The 2004 congressional elections in New Hampshire were held on November 2, 2004 to determine who will represent the state of New Hampshire in the United States House of Representatives.  It coincided with the state's senatorial and gubernatorial elections. Representatives are elected for two-year terms; those elected served in the 109th Congress from January 2005 until January 2007.  New Hampshire has two seats in the House, apportioned according to the 2000 United States Census.

Overview

References

2004
New Hampshire
2004 New Hampshire elections